Akbar Aâlami was born in Bandar Torkaman, Golestan from Azerbaijanis family. He is an Iranian politician, a former member of the Iranian parliament. He was nominated for 2009 and 2013 presidential elections.

Akbar A'lami has been a member of the 6th and 7th parliaments. He is well known for his direct criticism of both the Iranian leadership and the Guardian Council.

A'lami studied economics and law and hold a M.A. degree from Allameh Tabatabaii University.

References

External links
Official website

Deputies of Tabriz, Osku and Azarshahr
Politicians from Tabriz
Living people
Members of the 6th Islamic Consultative Assembly
Members of the 7th Islamic Consultative Assembly
1954 births
Islamic Iran Participation Front politicians
People from Golestan Province
21st-century Iranian politicians